Hashim Thaçi (born 24 April 1968) is a Kosovar Albanian politician who was the president of Kosovo from April 2016 until his resignation on 5 November 2020 to face a war crimes tribunal. He was the first prime minister of Kosovo and the Foreign minister and deputy prime minister in the new cabinet led by Isa Mustafa, which assumed office on 12 December 2014.

Thaçi is from the region of Drenica in Kosovo, which is where the KLA originated. He studied philosophy in Prishtina before moving to Switzerland, where he joined the Kosovo Liberation Army in 1993. He rose through the ranks of the KLA to become leader of the most powerful faction by 1999, during the Rambouillet negotiations. He then joined the interim Kosovo administration after the war.

Thaçi became leader of the Democratic Party of Kosovo (PDK), which won the largest share of the vote in the 2007 Kosovo elections. In 2008, Thaçi declared the independence of Kosovo and became its first prime minister. In 2016 he was elected President of Kosovo. Thaçi has pursued a pro-American policy while in office. There have been controversies regarding Thaçi's role in the KLA and allegations about him being involved in organized crime. In 2020, the Kosovo Specialist Chambers and Specialist Prosecutor's Office filed a ten-count Indictment, charging Hashim Thaçi and others for crimes against humanity and war crimes. Thaçi subsequently resigned from his position as president, in his words, in order to "protect the integrity of the presidency of Kosovo".

Early life and education
Hashim Thaçi was born in the village of Broćna, Srbica, SFR Yugoslavia (now Buroja, Skenderaj, Kosovo). Srbica is located in the Drenica valley, a historical region resistant of Serbian rule. Drenica would become the birthplace of the Kosovo Liberation Army (KLA) in the early 1990s.

Thaçi studied philosophy and history at the University of Pristina. By 1993, he was living in Switzerland, where he joined the Albanian political émigré group. He registered for postgraduate studies at the University of Zürich in the departments of history and international relations and later got his masters.

Role in KLA
In 1993, Thaçi became a member of the inner circle of the KLA. The charisma of leaders such as Thaçi helped the KLA gain support from Kosovo Albanians. Thaçi (nom de guerre "Gjarpëri" - The Snake) was responsible for securing financial means and armaments, and training recruits in Albania to be dispatched to Kosovo. On 11 July 1997, Thaçi was tried in absentia and convicted by the District Court in Pristina for terrorism associated with his activities in the KLA, sentenced to 10 years in prison.

In March 1999, Thaçi participated in the Rambouillet negotiations as the leader of the Kosovar Albanian team. Thaçi was perceived by western diplomats during the negotiations as the "voice of reason" within the KLA: his attendance at the negotiations demonstrated a willingness to accept autonomy for Kosovo within Serbia at a time when other rebel leaders rejected any solution short of full national independence.

Thaçi emerged from the final diplomatic settlement as the leader of the strongest faction within a KLA rife with factionalism. He moved quickly to consolidate power, unilaterally naming himself prime minister within a provisional government and allegedly ordering the assassination of the leaders of rival armed factions.

Controversies

Thaçi is alleged to have extensive criminal links. During the period of time when he was head of the Kosovo Liberation Army, The Washington Times reported that the KLA was financing its activities by trafficking the illegal drugs of heroin and cocaine into western Europe. The KLA received large funds from the Albanian diaspora in Europe and the United States. It is estimated that those funds amounted from $75 million to $100 million.  There is a possibility that among donors to the KLA were people involved in illegal activities such as drug trafficking, however insufficient evidence exists that the KLA itself was involved in such activities.

The BBC reported in 2000 that Thaçi is allegedly central to the criminal activities of the Kosovo Protection Corps (KPC), who reportedly extorted money from businessmen under the guise of "taxes" for his self-appointed government. While the KLA was officially disbanded at the end of armed conflict in Kosovo in 1999, the new Kosovo Protection Corps was composed primarily of former KLA fighters and the Democratic Party of Kosovo (PDK). The party was formed largely from the political leadership of the KLA. A near monopoly on the means of force, based on the absorption of the KLA into the KPC, allowed the Democratic Party of Kosovo to seize control of the machinery of government at the municipal level. The PDK has regularly used violence and intimidation of political rivals to maintain local political control and protect criminal enterprises that depend upon cooperation from friendly local authorities.

In 2001, the Democratic Party of Kosovo suffered electoral defeat in the first free elections in the province in 2001. The BBC said at the time, "The tumbling reputation of the former KLA was to have a disastrous effect on the PDK because of the perceived overlap between its political leadership and post-KLA organised crime."

A 2008 analysis of organised crime in Kosovo prepared by the German intelligence service BND and a confidential report contracted by the German military, the Bundeswehr, accuse Thaçi, Ramush Haradinaj, and Xhavit Haliti, the majority leader of the Kosovo parliament, of far-reaching involvement in organised crime. The BND writes: "The key players (including Haliti, Haradinaj, and Thaçi) are intimately involved in inter-linkages between politics, business, and organised crime structures in Kosovo." The report accuses Thaçi of leading a "criminal network operating throughout Kosovo" by the end of the 1990s. The BND report accuses Thaçi of contacts with the Czech and Albanian mafias. It says that he, together with Haliti, ordered killings by a professional hit man, 'Afrimi', who is responsible for at least 11 contract murders.

According to the 8 March 2016 issue of the French newspaper Le Figaro, Thaçi is likely to be charged by the ICTY for a wide range of atrocities, including organs trafficking. The paper also claims that former UNMIK administrator for Kosovo, Bernard Kouchner, might be summoned to testify. Kouchner himself has been regularly accused of "turning a blind eye" on the atrocities committed by the KLA members.

Council of Europe accusations

A report to the Council of Europe, written by Dick Marty, issued on 15 December 2010 states that Hacim Thaçi was the leader of the "Drenica Group" in charge of trafficking organs taken from Serbian prisoners. As reported by several international, Serbian, Kosovan and Albanian news agencies, in an interview for Albanian television on 24 December 2010, Thaçi said he would publish information about Marty and Marty's collaborators' names.

BBC news reported having seen a draft of the Council of Europe document, and asserts that it names "Hashim Thaci, Kosovo's current Prime Minister and wartime political leader of the KLA, 27 times in as many pages". They said the report charges the former KLA commanders of serious human rights abuses, including organ and drug trafficking. In 2011, Marty clarified that his report implicates Thaçi's close associates but not Thaçi himself.

Kosovo Specialist Chambers and Specialist Prosecutor's Office
On 24 April 2020, the Kosovo Specialist Chambers and Specialist Prosecutor's Office located in The Hague filed a ten-count Indictment for the Court’s consideration, charging Hashim Thaçi, Kadri Veseli and others for crimes against humanity and war crimes, including murder, enforced disappearance of persons, persecution, and torture. The indictment charges the suspects with approximately 100 murders of Kosovo Albanians, Serbs, Roma, and political opponents. According to the press release, the Specialist Prosecutor stated that it was necessary to make the issue public due to repeated efforts by Thaçi and Veseli to obstruct and undermine the work of the Kosovo Specialist Chambers.

Prime Minister of Kosovo

Victory in 2007 election and declaration of Kosovar independence

Kosovo elections were held on 17 November 2007. After early results based on 90 percent of the votes, Hashim Thaçi, who was on course to gain 34 percent, claimed victory for the PDK. He stated his intention to declare independence without delay on 10 December, the date set by the United Nations for the end of negotiations with Serbia. At 45 percent, the turnout at the election was particularly low, as most Serbs refused to vote.

On 19 November 2007, several EU foreign ministers warned Thaçi and his allies against proceeding with their declaration of independence without consultations. Luxembourg's Jean Asselborn and Sweden's Carl Bildt urged the PDK not to make any hasty moves, while the EU foreign policy chief Javier Solana stressed the importance of proper preparations prior to formal independence. After EU talks on Kosovo in London on 19 November 2007, the UK's Europe minister, Jim Murphy, said independence without foreign support could isolate the breakaway province.

Hashim Thaçi was designated as the next leader of Kosovo's government on 11 December 2007 by the Kosovar President Fatmir Sejdiu and told to form a government "as soon as possible". His Democratic Party of Kosovo (PDK) began coalition talks with the Democratic League of Kosovo (LDK) as well as the Alliance for New Kosovo (AKR). Those parties together control 75 seats of 120 in the assembly.

On 9 January 2008, Thaçi was elected as Prime Minister by parliament, with 85 votes in favor and 22 against. On this occasion, he stated his intention to achieve independence for Kosovo in the first half of 2008.

On 16 February 2008, Thaçi announced that the next day, 17 February, would be key for "implementing the will of the citizens of Kosovo", strongly implying the province would declare independence from Serbia. On 17 February 2008, Kosovo declared its independence from Serbia. Thaçi became Prime Minister of the newly independent state.

On 6 June 2008, a gunman broke into Thaçi's home in Pristina, while the latter was not present.

Relationships and Coalition with the Democratic League of Kosovo

President of Kosovo

2016 presidential election
Thaçi was elected the President of Kosovo in February 2016, and took office on 7 April 2016. In August 2019, Thaçi asserted that his nation would hold parliamentary elections on 6 October. The President cited that the nation is in need of a "functional and accountable government," which is capable enough to face challenges of the state and society.

Foreign policy

In January 2018, Thaçi said that Kosovo would have supported U.S. President Trump's decision to relocate the U.S. embassy from Tel Aviv to Jerusalem, which would have made it the only Muslim-majority nation to do so. But Thaçi told the Albanian newspaper Express that if his country was handed full membership of the global body, it would vote "all the time" with the U.S., even on the resolution motioned last month to protest Trump's decision. Thaçi met with Donald Trump on the sidelines of the United Nations General Assembly in September 2017 in New York, and invited Trump to visit Pristina, the capital of Kosovo. According to local media, he said their meeting was "exceptionally friendly, warm."

“The Head of State thanked President Trump for his personal support for Kosovo,” his office said in a statement, calling the U.S. a "strategic partner" and saying the support of Washington was "crucial to the peace, stability and overall development of Kosovo and the region." Thaçi told Pristina-based broadcaster RTV21, "President Trump, like all other U.S. presidents, has a clear vision for Kosovo. It is unique support to our country. He said that Kosovo is a wonderful country and that we are a wonderful people."

On 26 November 2019, an earthquake struck Albania. President Thaçi was part of a presidential delegation that visited the earthquake epicentre and expressed his condolences on behalf of Kosovo.

Resignation 
On 24 April 2020, the Kosovo Specialist Chambers and Specialist Prosecutor's Office located in The Hague filed a ten-count Indictment for the Court’s consideration, charging Hashim Thaçi, Kadri Veseli and others for crimes against humanity and war crimes, including murder, enforced disappearance of persons, persecution, and torture. The indictment charges the suspects with approximately 100 murders of Kosovo Albanians, Serbs, Roma, and political opponents.

On 5 November 2020, Thaçi announced his resignation to reporters “to protect the integrity of the presidency of Kosovo”. He was replaced by the Speaker of the Assembly of Kosovo Vjosa Osmani.

Countries visited 
List of state visits made by Hashim Thaçi as president.

Honors and awards
: On 20 June 2008 received a copy of the key of the city of Tirana on the occasion of his state visit to Albania. 
Also on 20 June, Thaçi was awarded the Honorary Citizen of the city of Vlorë, for his "historic role in making Kosovo an independent state".
In January 2015 Hashim Thaçi was awarded the Doctor Honoris Causa from the University of Tirana, for his contribution in peace-building in Western Balkans, promoting the process of European integrations and achieving the historic Brussels Agreement with Serbia.
On 4 October 2016 he was awarded Honorary Citizenship of Shkodër, in a ceremony led by the Mayor of this northern Albanian city.
: On 1 July 2012, Thaçi received a Doctor Honoris Causa degree as a Doctor of International Relations from the Geneva School of Diplomacy in a ceremony held in that city. Previous recipients of this award include Martin Gray, a Holocaust survivor and writer; Adolf Ogi, the former president of Switzerland; and José Ramos-Horta, President of East Timor and a Nobel Peace Prize winner.
: In 2014, Albanian and Serbian Caucuses of US Congress nominated President Thaçi and Serbian FM Ivica Dačić for the Nobel Peace Prize, for their role in achieving the Serbia-Kosovo peace deal.
: On 4 April 2015, on Ulcinj Day, Thaçi received the title of Honorary Citizen of Ulcinj by the town's municipal government.

Notes

References

Sources

Further reading

External links

 Prime Minister of Kosovo Official Website
 PDK Partia Demokratike e Kosovës (in Albanian)
 Kryetari Thaçi: Populli i Kosovës dhe UÇK-ja ishin një A Thaçi interview by "Kosova Sot" daily (in Albanian)
 BBC News Profile
 Thaçi comments on the future of Kosovo at United States Institute of Peace

|-

|-

|-

|-

1968 births
Democratic Party of Kosovo politicians
Deputy Prime Ministers of Kosovo
Foreign ministers of Kosovo
Government ministers of Kosovo
Kosovo Albanians
Kosovan soldiers
Kosovo Liberation Army soldiers
Living people
Military personnel from Skenderaj
Presidents of Kosovo
Prime ministers of Kosovo
University of Pristina alumni
University of Zurich alumni
Kosovan independence activists
People indicted for war crimes
Politicians from Mitrovica, Kosovo
People indicted by the Kosovo Specialist Chambers